Aster Ganno (c.1872–1964) was an Ethiopian Bible translator who worked with the better known Onesimos Nesib as a translator of the Oromo Bible, published in 1899.

Biography
She was born free, but was later enslaved by the king of Limmu-Ennarea. She was emancipated in 1886 when Italian ships intercepted a boat which was taking her to be sold on the Arabian Peninsula, then took her to Eritrea where the Imkullu school of the Swedish Evangelical Mission took her in. Aster (by Ethiopian custom, she is referred to by her first name) was educated at their school. Onesimos quickly “discovered that Aster was endowed with considerable mental gifts and possessed a real feeling for the Oromo language” (Arén 1978:383). She was assigned to compile an Oromo dictionary, which was first used in polishing a translation of New Testament published in 1893.

Aster also translated a book of Bible stories and wrote down 500 traditional Oromo riddles, fables, proverbs, and songs, many of which were published in a volume for beginning readers (1894). She later worked with Onesimos in compiling an Oromo hymnbook. Arén reports that a large amount of folklore she collected is still unpublished, preserved by the Hylander family (Arén 1978:384, fn. 71).

Aster and Onesimos completed translating the complete Bible into Oromo, which was printed in 1899. The title page and history credit Onesimos as the translator, but it appears that Aster's contribution was not, and still is not, adequately appreciated.

In 1904, Aster, together with Onesimos and other Oromos, were able to move from Eritrea back to Wellega, where they established schools, Aster serving as a teacher at Nekemte.

References

Bibliography 
 Arén, Gustav (1978). Evangelical Pioneers in Ethiopia. Stockholm: Stockholm: EFS Forlaget.
 Kebbede Hordofa Janko and Unseth, Peter (2003). "Aster Ganno". Encyclopaedia Aethiopica, vol. 1, edited by Siegbert Uhlig, pp. 387,388. Wiesbaden: Harrassowitz.

External links
Mekuria Bulcha, "Onesimos Nasib's Pioneering Contributions to Oromo Writing", Nordic Journal of African Studies 4(1): 36-59 (1995)
Dirshaye Menberu, "Onesimus Nesib", Dictionary of African Christian Bibliography

1872 births
1964 deaths
Bible translators
Ethiopian translators
Ethiopian scholars
Ethiopian Lutherans
Ethiopian evangelicals
Kidnapped African children
Oromo-language writers
Lutheran biblical scholars
Female Bible Translators
Translators of the Bible into Oromo